Stuart Coupland is an Australian former professional rugby league footballer who played in the 1990s. He played for Western Suburbs and South Sydney in the NSWRL/ARL competition.

Playing career
A St. George junior, Coupland made his first grade debut for South Sydney in round 1 of the 1993 NSWRL season against the Illawarra Steelers at WIN Stadium. Coupland played from the interchange bench in a 19-0 loss. Coupland played a further four games for South Sydney throughout the season. In 1994, Coupland joined Western Suburbs and played one match for the club, a 36-10 loss against Cronulla-Sutherland in round 4 of the competition.

References

1972 births
Western Suburbs Magpies players
South Sydney Rabbitohs players
Australian rugby league players
Rugby league second-rows
Rugby league props
Living people